Yves-Marie Adeline Soret de Boisbrunet (born March 24, 1960 in Poitiers, France) better known as Yves-Marie Adeline, is a French Catholic writer. He also was the founder and leader of the French political party, Alliance Royale.

Life
He is the father of eight.
He taught to the University of Poitiers from 1986 till 1989, then left the university and alternated periods of writing books and collaboration in political offices. He teaches again today the history of the political ideas in various centers of higher education.

Philosophy
His philosophic work concerns three areas of research: in general philosophy, in aesthetics and in politics.
In his book Le Carré des philosophes (the square of philosophers), he builds a " philosophic square " sides of which are four propositions: Science, Existence, Presence, and Will. The proposition "Existence" is original: Adeline distinguishes the being of the existence itself ; according to him, existence is a dimension of the being. So we can say : the time exists, or a body exists, but a soul does not exist, it "is" only, it is without existing, without existence. The presence in the man of a power recovering from the being but not from the existence shows itself by the Will. Adeline wants it to be the criterion of distinction between the man and quite other creature. Adeline considers the will as typically human, rather than the consciousness, of which he considers that it is a little sure concept in philosophy. 
The will is on the contrary the demonstration of a being in the man, this nonexistent being which shows that a man is not only an object of existence.

Yves - Marie Adeline's aesthetic works update the doctrine of Empedocles according to whom " only the same knows the same ", but also the aristotelian finalism, according to which the best expert of a saddle is not the craftsman, but the rider. In his book "La Musique et le monde" (music and world),he fights against the official doctrine of the so-called "contemporary music", asserting that this music has been conceived on an exclusively theoretical vision. In "L'Appel des sirènes" (the appeal of sirens), Adeline develops his thought and widens it to the plastic arts.

In "Le Pouvoir légitime" (the justifiable power), preferring good institutions to good leaders, he recommends " an abdication of each of us for the benefit of a common and wholesome principle ", and concludes that a modern monarchy is the best regime. Opponent of the maurrassism, or any other nationalism, he prefers Bonald, and advances the mixed regime (monarchy - aristocracy - democracy).

Yves-Marie Adeline is also a poet : L'Epouse (the wife); Le Manteau d'étoiles (the coat of stars); Radieuse hostie (radiant host) ; Les Angéliques (angelica).

He has been the president of Alliance Royale, the French royalist party. Candidate with the European elections in 2004, then candidate with presidential election in 2007, he did not obtain the 500 votes of the mayors. With the municipal elections of March 2008 in the 7th arrondissement of Paris, he got 0.96%. He has since resigned the political militancy.

Works
 L'Aube royale (Sicre 1991)
 La Musique et le monde (Téqui 1994)
 Le Roi et le monde moderne (C&T 1995)
 Le Carré des philosophes (Trédaniel 1995)
 La Droite piégée (C&T 1996)
 Le Pouvoir légitime (C&T 1997)
 La Droite où l'on n'arrive jamais (Sicre 2000)
 Le Royalisme en questions (Editions de Paris / L'Age d'Homme 2002)
 Les Amours dangereuses, poèmes (Editions Jean d'Orcival 1994)
 La Main offerte, poèmes (Editions Jean d'Orcival 1994)
 L'Epouse, poèmes (Sicre 2002)
 Le Manteau d'étoiles, poèmes (Editions de Paris 2002)
 Radieuse Hostie, poèmes (Editions de Paris 2004)
 L'Appel des sirènes (Editions de Paris 200
 Marie-Antoinette, Drame en cinq actes, Editions de Paris, 2005. [présentation en ligne]
 Histoire mondiale des idées politiques (Ellipses 2007)
 Les Angéliques, poèmes, Via Romana, 2008
 La Pensée antique, Ellipses, 2008

References

External links
Author's blog
" Yves-Marie Adeline On Video" February 18, 2007

1960 births
Living people
Politicians of the French Fifth Republic
French monarchists
20th-century French philosophers
21st-century French philosophers
Catholic philosophers
French Roman Catholic writers
20th-century French writers
20th-century French male writers
21st-century French writers
Academic staff of the University of Poitiers
21st-century French male writers